Karkador is the sixth album by the Japanese electronic rock band P-Model, and the first where frontman Susumu Hirasawa was the sole remaining founding member.

Background and composition
Karkador was mainly inspired by the dreams of P-Model's vocalist Susumu Hirasawa. He had been seeing a Jungian counselor, as he was in a troubled mental state at the time. The counselor suggested that he record his dreams in a notebook to aid his recovery. He developed a narrative and lyrics for the album based on those notes.

Sadatoshi Tainaka, the band's original drummer, decided to leave after the previous tour's conclusion. He was replaced by Yasuhiro Araki, a huge fan of P-Model who had formerly played in a punk rock band. The band got signed to Alfa Records's sub-label for underground acts Edge, which allowed them to use Alfa's studios and mixing equipment, which was far better than what they had access to during their independent period.

Recording and production
In addition to Hirasawa's journal, P-Model used songwriting contributions from their keyboardist Shunichi Miura and bassist Tadahiko Yokogawa. Hirasawa and Yokogawa had equal creative control over the band, though Yokogawa has said that his influence on the album was somewhat nuanced. Although the album has a new wave style much like 1984's Scuba, it also includes a wider array of sounds; mixing live drumming with programmed drumming, march-styled rhythms, and classical instruments. The band tried to keep the album raw, with Yokogawa hoping add some raw explosive power to the material, resulting in a brighter, more upbeat sound than recent efforts.

Hirasawa had many ideas in regards to the sound of the album, but faced issues with engineering. He wanted Karkador to sound "underground", feeling that in-house engineer at Gok Studio Yoshiaki Kondo was best for the job. Kondo worked on some recordings, making the drums purposefully messy, but his work was altered by an Alfa in house mixing engineer—who only worked on the album due to company policy—without Hirasawa's consent. Miura had doubts as to the direction that P-Model was taking and left the band alongside Yokogawa, who felt that touring in support of the album was too rigorous. Due to their departure, half of the album was never performed live after from 1986 onwards.

Track listing

Personnel
 P-Model - Arrangements
 Susumu Hirasawa - Vocals, Guitar
 Shunichi Miura - Keyboards, Backing vocals
  - Bass, Lead vocals on "Oar", Backing vocals, Electric violin, Ocarinas (bass, tenor and soprano), MSX, Keyboards, Sampler
 Yasuhiro Araki - Drums, Electronic drums, Percussion

 Staff
 Akiro "Kamio" Arishima (AC Unit) - Production
 Toshikazu Awano (Alfa Records) - A&R Coordination
 Mitsuru Hirose (Model House) - Artist Management
 Mitsuo Koike (Alfa Records) - Mixing, Engineering
 Yoshiaki Kondo (Gok Sound) and Akitsugu Doi (Alfa Records) - Additional Engineering
 Hideaki Nojima (Alfa Records) and Kazuaki Nagai (Somewhere) - Assistant Engineering
 Hiroaki Sugawara (Gok Sound) - Digital Equipment Operation
 Teppei Kasai (CBS-Sony) - Mastering engineer
 Yuichi Hirasawa - Art Direction & 
 Kayo Muto - Art Drawing
 Hideki Namai - Photography
 Hideki Higashi (Touch-Up) - Hair & Makeup
 Akemi Tsujitani (AC Unit) - Costuming
 Ginza Matsuzakaya, Ginza Miyuki-Dori Jun, Hiromichi Nakano, Viva You - Clothes
 Toshinao Tsukui (Alfa Records) - Cover Coordination
 Special Thanks to:  (Tōkai Gakki) (for Hirasawa), Take Off Studio (for rehearsal), Akemi Arai (Toei), Yoshito Imai (Media Bum), Taro Yamamoto, Yuji Matsuda, Hisaaki Kato, Takashi Kokubo, Osamu Ishii, Miyuki & Miwa Kumagaya, Kuni, Shuji Furu, Akira, Ryuta Staff Room HB, Ted Osawa, Akira Sakurai

Release history

"Leak" is included on the TWINS SOUND SAMPLER Vol.4～TECHNO POP COLLECTION various artists compilation.

References

External links 
 Karkador at Susumu Hirasawa's website
 
 Karkador at Sony Music's official site
 , directed by Peter Callas

1985 albums
P-Model albums
Alfa Records albums
Japanese-language albums